Joe Bolton (December 3, 1961 – March 1990) was an American poet.

He was born in Cadiz, Kentucky. He completed a master's degree at the University of Florida in 1988.  In 1990, after completing his Master of Fine Arts, he died by suicide. He published three books of poetry.

Bibliography
Breckinridge County Suite (The Cummington Press, 1987).
Days of Summer Gone (Galileo Press, 1990).
The Last Nostalgia Poems, 1982–1990, edited by Donald Justice (University of Arkansas Press, 1999) .

References

External links
 The Poetry of Joe Bolton
 Remembering Joe Bolton by Tonya Parsons
 Oysterboy Review: Joe Bolton

1961 births
1990 suicides
University of Florida alumni
Poets from Kentucky
20th-century American poets
American male poets
20th-century American male writers
1990 deaths